Mangana may refer to:

Europe 
 Mangana (Constantinople), a quarter of Byzantine-era Constantinople where a palace and two monasteries were located
 Mangana Tower, a tower of unknown origin in Cuenca, Spain
 Mangana, Xanthi, a settlement in Xanthi regional unit, Greece

Tasmania 
 Mangana, a Bruny Island ferry
 Truganini (Mangana), a chief of the Bruny Island people
 Mangana, a ship of the Tasmanian Steam Navigation Company 
 Mangana, Tasmania, a village, mountain and gold mine in Tasmania, Australia

See also 
 Mangan (disambiguation)